Janne Blichert-Toft is a geochemist, specializing in the use of isotopes with applications in understanding  planetary mantle-crust evolution, as well as the chemical composition of matter in the universe. To further this research, Blichert-Toft has developed techniques for high-precision Isotope-ratio mass spectrometry measurements.

Biography
1988 to 1991: Visiting scientist at the Lamont–Doherty Earth Observatory at Columbia University, as part of her degrees
1996: Visiting scientist at University of California at Berkeley
2000: Visiting professor at Harvard University
2003: Associate professor at CalTech

Subsequently, Blichter-Toft was at the Australian National University in 2004, at Cambridge University in 2005, at Tokyo University in 2006, and at the University of Chicago in 2011.

From 2008 to 2015, she was also adjunct faculty and Distinguished Wiess Visiting Scholar at Rice University.

Education
1990: M.Sc., University of Copenhagen
1993: Ph.D., Earth Sciences, University of Copenhagen
1996: École normale supérieure de Lyon, Marie-Curie Post-Doctoral Fellow
2000: Habilitation à Diriger des Recherches (HDR), Université Claude Bernard, Lyon I.

After her Marie-Curie post-doctorate, Blichert-Toft joined the CNRS in 1997 and became Director of Research in 2002 working at the École normale supérieure de Lyon.

Work
After her Marie-Curie Post-Doctorate, Blichert-Toft joined the Centre national de la recherche scientifique (CNRS) in 1997 and became Director of Research in 2002, working at the École normale supérieure de Lyon.

She pioneered the application of hafnium isotopes to the evolution of the Earth and the early solar system.

Publications
Blichert-Toft is currently on the Editorial Board of at least the following three publications: 
G-Cubed (Geochemistry, Geophysics, Geosystems) published by the American Geophysical Union
Geochemical Perspectives published by the European Association of Geochemistry
Geochimica et Cosmochimica Acta published by the Geochemical Society

She currently is the 2022–2024 geochemistry principal editor with the scientific magazine "Elements" and has previously served as Associate Editor for the Geochemical Society's newsletter "Geochemical News". The magazine "Elements" is jointly published by the Mineralogical Society of America, the Mineralogical Society of Great Britain and Ireland, the Mineralogical Association of Canada, the Geochemical Society, The Clay Minerals Society, the European Association of Geochemistry, the International Association of GeoChemistry, the Société Française de Minéralogie et de Cristallographie, the Association of Applied Geochemists, the Deutsche Mineralogische Gesellschaft, the Società Italiana di Mineralogia e Petrologia, the International Association of Geoanalysts, the Polskie Towarzystwo Mineralogiczne (Mineralogical Society of Poland), the Sociedad Española de Mineralogía (Spanish Mineralogical Society), the Swiss Geological Society, the  Meteoritical Society, the Japan Association of Mineralogical Sciences and the International Association on the Genesis of Ore Deposits.

Awards
 2001: Bronze Medal, Centre national de la recherche scientifique (CNRS) 
 2005: Prix Etienne Roth du Commissariat à l'énergie atomique (CEA), Académie des Sciences
 2010: Geochemistry Fellow of the Geochemical Society and the European Association of Geochemistry
 2010: The Medal of the Ecole Normale Supérieure de Lyon
 2012: Fellow of the American Geophysical Union
 2012: Silver Medal, Centre national de la recherche scientifique (CNRS) 
 2015: The Danish Geological Society's Steno Medal
 2015: Invited Plenary Speaker at the Goldschmidt Conference, Prague
 2016: Member of the Royal Danish Academy of Sciences and Letters
 2022: The American Geophysical Union's Harry Hess Medal
 2022: The BRGM Dolomieu Prize

References

Mass spectrometrists
French volcanologists
French geophysicists
Women geophysicists
French geochemists
Fellows of the American Geophysical Union
Living people
University of Copenhagen alumni
20th-century American women scientists
21st-century American women scientists
Year of birth missing (living people)
Academic staff of the École Normale Supérieure
American women academics
Research directors of the French National Centre for Scientific Research